The Beacon City School District (also known as the Beacon City Schools) is one of 18 public school districts serving residents of Dutchess County, New York, United States. The district serves the City of Beacon and parts of the Town of Fishkill and Town of Wappinger; it is one of 57 small city school districts in New York State.

The district is composed of four elementary schools, a middle school, a high school, an administration building, and a transportation facility. It has a student enrollment of 2577 students as of end of the 2020-21 school year.

Its elementary school serves pre-kindergarten through 5th grade, its middle school serves 6-8th grade and the high school serves 9-12th grade.

Schools

Elementary schools

Rombout Middle School
Rombout Middle School is located at 84 Matteawan Road, Beacon, New York, 12508. It offers volleyball, baseball, basketball, football, and a variety of clubs. As of the end of the 2020-21 school year, it educated 632 students.

High schools

Former Beacon High School
The old Beacon High School was shut down in order to make a proper transition to the New Beacon High School. The school was then turned into an alternative high school for several years. It had served as the city's high school since 1913, before being closed in 2002. The school was sold to an art group in 2002 which defaulted on the mortgage in 2006. The school has since been resold to an art partnership in an all-cash deal.

New Beacon High School

The new Beacon High School is located at 101 Matteawan Road, Beacon, New York 12508. It was finished in 2001 and opened in 2002. The school educated 863 students as of the end of the 2020-2021 school year. Beacon High School has several wings and features such amenities as an indoor swimming pool, and the largest theater north of North Rockland and south of Albany. In 2021, Beacon High School switched to compete in Section 9 of the New York State Public High School Athletic Association (NYSPHSAA).

References

External links
 Beacon City School District

School districts in New York (state)
Beacon, New York
Education in Dutchess County, New York
2002 establishments in New York (state)